Marea Galeguista is an electoral coalition formed on 30 May 2020 to contest the rescheduled 2020 Galician regional election on 12 July. Its main candidate to the Xunta de Galicia is Pancho Casal. The alliance is formed by Commitment to Galicia (CxG), Galicianist Party (PG) and En Marea, the latter having broken up with its previous partners: Podemos, Anova and EU.

Composition

Electoral performance

Parliament of Galicia

References

2020 establishments in Galicia (Spain)
Left-wing political party alliances
Political parties established in 2020
Political parties in Galicia (Spain)
Political party alliances in Spain